Face Off is a collaborative album by American rapper Bow Wow and American singer Omarion. The album was released on December 11, 2007 through Columbia Records. The production on the album was handled by Jermaine Dupri, Jim Jonsin, Stereotypes, T-Pain, No I.D. and Lil Ronnie among others. 

Face Off was supported by two singles: "Girlfriend" and "Hey Baby (Jump Off)." The album also received generally positive reviews from music critics and was a moderate commercial success. The album debuted at number 11 on the US Billboard 200 chart, selling 107,000 copies in the first week.

Singles
The first single from the album was "Girlfriend". The single was released on October 12, 2007 and was produced by Don Vito and Cheeze. The single debuted at number 82 on the US Billboard Hot 100 chart on the week of November 11, 2007. After climbing the charts for six weeks, on the week of December 29, 2007, the single entered the top-40 and reached its peak at number 33 on the chart.

The second single from the album "Hey Baby (Jump Off)." The single was released on December 25, 2007 and was produced by Croatian producer Koolade. The single failed to appear on the Hot 100 chart but managed to peak at number 24 on the US Hot Rap Songs chart on the week of March 15, 2008.

Commercial performance
Face Off debuted at number 11 on the US Billboard 200 chart, selling 107,000 copies in the first week. This became Omarion's first release to miss the top-ten and Bow Wow's first since his 2001 release Doggy Bag. On February 13, 2008, the album was certified gold by the Recording Industry Association of America (RIAA) for sales of over 500,000 copies in the United States.

Track listing

Samples credits
"Hey Baby (Jump Off)" contains a sample of "Going Back to Cali" as performed by LL Cool J
"Let Me Hold You" contains a sample of "If Only for One Night" as performed by Luther Vandross

Charts

Weekly charts

Year-end charts

Certifications

References

External links
Face Off Official website

2007 albums
Bow Wow (rapper) albums
Omarion albums
Albums produced by The-Dream
Albums produced by the Neptunes
Albums produced by Scott Storch
Albums produced by T-Pain
Albums produced by Jim Jonsin
Albums produced by L.T. Hutton
Vocal duet albums
Columbia Records albums
Collaborative albums